Éanna Ryan (born 1963 in Killimordaly, County Galway) is a former Irish sportsperson. He played hurling with his local club Killimordaly and with the Galway senior inter-county team in the 1980s and 1990s.  Ryan won back-to-back All-Ireland winners' medals with Galway in 1987 and 1988.

References

1963 births
Living people
Killimordaly hurlers
Galway inter-county hurlers
Connacht inter-provincial hurlers
All-Ireland Senior Hurling Championship winners